Christian Leaders Institute (CLI), founded in 2006, offers free online  correspondence religious classes. Christian Leaders Institute is one of the religious organization  of Christian Leaders Ministries, which was founded in 2001. Other ministries at Christian Leaders Ministries are Christian Leaders Alliance and Christian Leaders College.

History 
Christian Leaders, NFP (now Christian Leaders Ministries was founded by Rev. Henry Reyenga Jr., Rich DeVos, Sr. and Ron Parr on September 20 of 2001, prompted by the attack on the World Trade Center on September 11, 2001. Reyenga contacted DeVos and Parr to support a freemium model of high-quality ministry training.

Rev. Reyenga had planted churches and worked with the Bible League before co-founding Christian Leaders Institute. He has spoken at various conferences throughout the world, in places like Winebrenner Theological Seminary.

Dr. David Feddes, previously the English broadcast minister for the Back to God ministries, became the Provost in 2008. Feddes is a PhD graduate from Trinity Evangelical Divinity School.

The president of the CLI Board of Trustees is Brian DeCook. He is also the President of Peacefire.

Free quality religious education 
Christian Leaders Institute uses moodle as its digital campus and wordpress as its marketing platform. Their world-headquarters are located in Spring Lake, Michigan. CLI uses moodle in such a way as to include the tracking of quizzes and assignments for the establishment of quality accountability, transcripts, and feedback. Christian Leaders Institute offers over 180 credits of quality religious training that helps reproduce balanced Christianity.  One CLI graduate, John Ntui-Abung was published in 2017. In his "acknowledgement" of "The Chaos of the Prosperity Gospel: A Case Study of Two Prominent Nigerian Pastors with Churches over 150 Countries Revealed to Be Spreading Fraudulent Gospels", Ntui-Abung credited CLI's education as correcting his prosperity gospel views in Nigeria.

Donation-driven 
Christian Leaders Institute is funded by donations. Some donations are for the non-profit mission, while other donations are for services. CLI characterizes themselves as a “generosity-driven” model of ministry training. They offer religious education certificates, diplomas, and degrees. They are incorporated in the states of Illinois, Florida, and Michigan.

Local but global ordinations 
Christian Leaders Institute is non-denominational, but Reyenga and Feddes are graduates of Calvin Seminary with ties to the Christian Reformed Church. CLI began a program of minister ordination with its sister organization, Christian Leaders Alliance CLA in 2014. These ordinations require ministry training at Christian Leaders Institute. They must gather three local endorsements. In the CLA system of ordination, Christian leaders are ordained locally and then are included in the global directory of the Christian Leaders Alliance. The Christian Leaders Alliance ordains men but also women to the office of deacon minister.

Graduates 
The school's educational methodology is to decentralize the distance learning into local mentoring relationships. Some local leaders start mentor centers, which form accountability for local learning and practice.

Accreditation 
Christian Leaders Institute is accredited with the non-traditional accrediting organization called The International Association of Bible Colleges and Seminaries (IABCS). This accreditation association was founded in the 1950s, but is not connected to US Federal Government Accreditation agencies, which oversee schools that are connected to student loans. In November 2019, the Association for Biblical Higher Education (ABHE) accepted Christian Leaders College into Applicant Status for accreditation that is recognized by the United States Department of Education and has been listed in ABHE directory since then.

CHEA seminaries such as Calvin Seminary,  Western Theological Seminary and Northern Seminary will accept merited students with the CLI Bachelor of Divinity Degree within their individual acceptance guidelines.

References

Christian websites
Organizations based in Michigan
Ottawa County, Michigan
Christian organizations established in 2001
Educational institutions established in 2001
2001 establishments in Michigan